Mayhem is a Norwegian black metal band from Oslo. Formed in 1984, the group originally featured guitarist and lead vocalist Øystein "Euronymous" Aarseth (originally known as "Destructor"), bassist and second vocalist Jørn "Necrobutcher" Stubberud and drummer Kjetil Manheim. The band's current lineup includes Necrobutcher (who rejoined in 1995 after originally leaving in 1991), drummer Jan Axel "Hellhammer" Blomberg (since 1988), vocalist Attila Csihar (first from 1992 to 1993, and since 2004), and guitarists Morten Bergeton "Teloch" Iversen (since 2011) and Charles "Ghul" Hedger (since 2012).

History

1984–1993
Mayhem was formed in 1984 by Necrobutcher with Euronymous and Manheim. After two years of rehearsals, the trio released its first demo Pure Fucking Armageddon in early 1986. Shortly after its release, the group became a four-piece when Eirik "Messiah" Norheim took over vocals from Euronymous. Within a year, the vocalist had been replaced by Sven Erik "Maniac" Kristiansen, who performed on the group's first EP Deathcrush. Both Maniac and Manheim left shortly after the EP's release, and were briefly replaced by Vomit members Kittil Kittilsen and Torben Grue, respectively.

During early 1988, Euronymous and Necrobutcher rebuilt Mayhem with the addition of new vocalist Per "Dead" Ohlin and drummer Jan Axel "Hellhammer" Blomberg. The new incarnation remained stable for several years, recording several live releases, but did not issue a full-length studio album. On 8 April 1991, Dead committed suicide at a house shared with Euronymous and Hellhammer. Due to his death, and the guitarist's subsequent actions (including taking photos of his body, one of which was later used as the cover for a bootleg release), Necrobutcher left Mayhem.

After a brief stint with Stian "Occultus" Johannsen, the band returned in late 1991 with Attila Csihar on vocals and Varg "Count Grishnackh" Vikernes on bass. This lineup recorded Mayhem's long-awaited full-length debut De Mysteriis Dom Sathanas, which featured material written by Dead and Necrobutcher. However, before it could be released, Vikernes murdered Euronymous on August 10, 1993, stabbing the guitarist 23 times after growing tensions and business disputes. The group consequently disbanded, with De Mysteriis Dom Sathanas receiving a release in 1994.

Since 1995
In late 1995, Mayhem was reformed with a lineup including Hellhammer, former members Maniac (vocals) and Necrobutcher (bass), and new guitarist Rune "Blasphemer" Eriksen. This incarnation remained intact for almost nine years, issuing the group's second and third full-length studio albums, Grand Declaration of War and Chimera. In November 2004, Maniac left the band and was replaced by another former vocalist, Attila Csihar. One more album followed, Ordo Ad Chao, before Blasphemer left in August 2008 claiming that he "simply [didn't] see any future for me in the band anymore".

Blasphemer was replaced on tour by Krister "Morfeus" Dreyer starting in October 2008, who was joined by French guitarist Silmaeth starting in March 2009. Just under two years later, Silmaeth was replaced by Morten Bergeton "Teloch" Iversen, and in 2012 Morfeus was replaced by Charles "Ghul" Hedger.

Members

Current

Former

Timeline

Lineups

References

External links
Mayhem official website

Mayhem (band)